Theophilus was the High Priest in the Second Temple in Jerusalem from 37 to 41 CE according to Josephus's Antiquities of the Jews.  He was a member of one of the wealthiest and most influential Jewish families in Iudaea Province during the 1st century.  A growing but still uncommon belief points to High Priest Theophilus as the person to whom the Gospel of Luke is addressed, but Theophilus is a common enough name that there are many other possibilities for the addressee of Luke's Gospel and the Acts of the Apostles. In its favor is the fact that in Luke Theophilus is called by the title Most Excellent (kratiste), indicating he held a political office like high priest, the ethnarch under the Romans. In Acts 1:1 he does not have this honorific indicating that he no longer held an office of the Roman government. This provides an unusual identifier that eliminates other candidates for whom such a change in office was not effected. 

The honorific, kratiste, would also provide evidence that the Gospel of Luke was written during his high priesthood, 37 to 41 CE. The period coincides with the reign of Gaius Caligula, his persecution and planned ethnocide of the Jews and Nazarenes, and the desecration of the Temple with his giant, idolatrous statue.    

Theophilus was the son of Ananus and the brother of Eleazar, Jonathan, Matthias and Ananus, all of whom served as High Priests.  He was also the brother-in-law of Joseph Caiaphas, the High Priest before whom Jesus of Nazareth appeared.  In addition, his son Matthias served as the next to the last High Priest before the destruction of the Temple by the Romans.

Archeological evidence confirming the existence of Theophilus, as an ossuary has been discovered bearing the inscription, "Yehoḥanah (Johanna) daughter of Yehoḥanan (Jonathan) son of Thefilus (Theophilus) the High Priest".  The details of this ossuary have been published in the Israel Exploration Journal.  Therefore, Theophilus had at least one other son, named Jonathan, father to Johanna. 

The name Johanna appears twice in the New Testament in the Gospel of Luke. First as one of women healed by Jesus who travels with Jesus and the disciples to Jerusalem. Her second appearance also in the Gospel of Luke is on Easter Sunday when she and other women visits the empty tomb. It is unlikely, however, that the Johanna in the Gospel of Luke is the same Johanna as the one mentioned on the ossuary. According to Richard Bauckham, Johanna was "the fifth most popular woman's name in Jewish Palestine," and the Johanna of the Gospel of Luke was likely from Galilee, not from Jerusalem. High Priests took office when at least 30 years old (Hebrew reckoning). Caiaphas was thus probably older than Theophilus. It was unusual for a son-in-law to take precedence over a son. If Theophilus was in his thirties in the period 37-41 CE, then a granddaughter, Johanna, would not have been born in the period of the Gospels up to 30 CE.

See also
 Theophilus (biblical)

Notes

References

 This article is a summary of an article appearing in Dossiers d'Archeologie as "A la recherche de Theophile", December 2 – January 3; A detailed description of the ossuary mentioned in this article is contained in an article by D. Barag and D. Flusser, "The Ossuary of Yehohanah Granddaughter of the High Priest Theophilus", Israel Exploration Journal, 36 (1986), 39–44.

1st-century High Priests of Israel
1st-century clergy